Miss World Philippines 2022 was the 11th edition of the Miss World Philippines pageant. It was held on June 5, 2022. Tracy Perez of Cebu City crowned Gwendolyne Fourniol of Negros Occidental as her successor at the end of the event.

In this edition, five additional titleholders were also elected: Alison Black as Miss Supranational Philippines 2022, Ashley Montenegro as Miss Eco Philippines 2022, Ingrid Santamaria as Reina Hispanoamericana Filipinas 2022, Beatriz McLelland as Miss Eco Teen Philippines 2022, and Justine Felizarta as Miss Tourism World Philippines 2022.

The pageant was broadcast by KTX.ph and CNN Philippines.

Results

Color keys
  The contestant Won in an International pageant.
  The contestant was a Runner-up in an International pageant.
  The contestant was a Semi-Finalist in an International pageant.

Special awards

Events

Fast Track Events

Head To Head Challenge

Contestants
36 contestants competed for the four titles.

References

External links
 

Beauty pageants in the Philippines
2022
2022 beauty pageants
2022 in the Philippines